Jacques de Bascher (8 July 1951 – 3 September 1989) was a French dandy, member of the jet set, and Karl Lagerfeld's companion from 1971 until his death, as well as Yves Saint Laurent's lover in 1973.

Biography

Early years
Jacques de Bascher was the son of Antony de Bascher (1909-1975), governor of the province of Cholon in Vietnam and an executive of Shell's insurance department on his return to France in 1955. Bascher's mother, Armelle Petit, is descended from a line of landowners in Limousin.  Jacques de Bascher had two brothers and two sisters. He spent his childhood in a bourgeois Catholic family, between an apartment in Neuilly-sur-Seine on boulevard Commandant-Charcot, which overlooks the Bois de Boulogne and the castle Berrière near Nantes.  He studied at the small high school Pasteur, then high school Janson de Sailly, and finally high school Charlemagne. He seduced one of his high school teachers, realizing his beauty and physical demeanor was a major asset.

At the age of twenty, he spent his military service in the French Navy. He started his service on the ship Orage, which was sailing to Martinique and Papeete. He became some sort of reporter, writing a ship's newsletter and airing music and interviews on the ship's radio. He was serving a month's imprisonment at the Arue camp in Tahiti for provocative behavior and misbehaving with his mates. After just nine months in the navy, he was sent back to France. During this service, he befriended a lot of people, including Philippe Heurtault, who became his photographer in later years.

When he returned to Paris, he attended the Panthéon-Assas University for a few months and became a steward for Air France in 1972, but it was high society clubs that attracted him. According to Gilles Martin-Chauffier, for fifteen years, Jacques de Bascher "has evolved like a snake in the grass" between the gardens of the Tuileries, the five-stars, the Parisian backrooms, the Palace, the rue Sainte-Anne, (Club Sept), the Blue Hand in Montreuil, the castle of his family and the big festivals of the fashion world.

Life with Lagerfeld 
Jacques de Bascher first met Karl Lagerfeld at the Nuage at the age of twenty-one. A few months later, after Jacques de Bascher resigned from Air France, they went to live together until 1989. Lagerfeld claimed their relationship was platonic and non-physical. Lagerfeld told French journalist Marie Ottavi: 

Karl Lagerfeld appreciated Bascher's vast literary culture and impertinence, his aristocratic appearance and his manner of dressing. Kenzo Takada hired Jacques' brother Xavier de Bascher to be his general manager. They usually spend their time in gay nightclubs, like “Le 7”.

In 1973, Yves Saint Laurent, at the time still companion of Pierre Bergé, fell in love with Jacques de Bascher. While Lagerfeld pretended he didn't notice, Yves Saint Laurent and Jacques de Bascher had an unbalanced and destructive relationship. Bergé threatened Bascher, who put an end to this affair.

During these years, Jacques de Bascher, who did not work and was maintained by Karl Lagerfeld fell into risky sexual practices, and eventually drugs and alcohol put him into a paranoid state. Sex was a huge part of de Bascher's life. He had relationships with both men and women. He was known for organizing orgies and an infamous BDSM party, named “Black Moratorium”, which was funded by Lagerfeld.

Last years and death 
Jacques de Bascher discovered that he was HIV positive in 1984. At the end of his life, he cut himself off from everyone, unable to bear his physical decline. He died of AIDS at Raymond Poincaré University Hospital in 1989, watched over by Karl Lagerfeld, who had an extra bed installed by his bedside. The following year Karl Lagerfeld bought a house near Hamburg, which he named Villa Jako in Jacques de Bascher's memory. In 1998, Lagerfeld launched a fragrance called Jako. The intimate, family-only funeral Mass took place in the chapel of the Père-Lachaise Cemetery; a second Mass was celebrated in the chapel of Mée-sur-Seine, where Karl Lagerfeld owned property, in the presence of Jacques de Bascher's mother and friends, including his former fiancée, Princess Diane de Beauvau-Craon.

See also 
Dandyism within France

References

External links 
 Jacques de Bascher by Philippe Heurtault.

1951 births
1989 deaths
Socialites from Paris
French bisexual people
Bisexual men
AIDS-related deaths in France
Burials at Père Lachaise Cemetery
20th-century French LGBT people